The Parish church of Saint Joseph is a Roman Catholic Baroque parish church located in Msida, Malta.

History
The first parish of Msida was built in 1867  whilst under the religious guidance of Archbishop Gaetano Pace Forno. The chosen patron was the Immaculate Conception. A larger church dedicated to St Joseph was built later on. Works on this new building were finished by 1889. The church was consecrated on April 22, 1894.

References

External links 

Msida
19th-century Roman Catholic church buildings in Malta
National Inventory of the Cultural Property of the Maltese Islands
Baroque church buildings in Malta
Limestone churches in Malta
Roman Catholic churches completed in 1889